Longechaux is a commune in the Doubs department in the Bourgogne-Franche-Comté region in eastern France.

Geography

Population

Economy
Agriculture and the dairy industry remain the principal activities of the village.

See also
 Communes of the Doubs department

References

External links

 Longechaux on the intercommunal Web site of the department 

Communes of Doubs